David R. Barker (born May 7, 1961) is an American author, academic, businessman, and politician, who began serving as a regent on the Board of Regents of the State of Iowa on May 1, 2019. A former economist for the Federal Reserve, Barker operates a real estate and finance company and is an Iowa Republican Party official.  His academic research has been covered in print and broadcast media including Marketplace, As It Happens, The Economist, Time, and The New York Times. He has also written for U.S. News & World Report, The Christian Science Monitor, Collier's, and other publications.

Early life and education
David Barker is a sixth-generation Iowan. He graduated from Iowa City West High School, then received a B.A. from the University of California at Berkeley, and an M.A. and Ph.D. in economics from the University of Chicago. He also attended the London School of Economics during his junior year of college.

Academic career
After completing graduate school Barker worked as an economist at the Federal Reserve Bank of New York, helping to develop an early warning system for failing banks and methods to detect racial discrimination in mortgage lending, as well as conducting analysis of the Basel Accord capital requirements.

After moving back to Iowa in 1994, Barker taught real estate and corporate finance at the University of Iowa as an adjunct professor. In 1997 he began teaching real estate to MBAs at the University of Chicago, which he continued to do until 2007. Barker also taught urban economics to undergraduates at the University of Chicago for several years. He has also taught at CIMBA in Paderno del Grappa, Italy.

Barker's academic research covers a variety of topics, including real estate markets, urban economics, terrorism insurance, health economics, business ethics, economic history, and libertarian political economy.

A 2009 paper on the effects of home ownership on children received widespread attention. It argued that previous academic work showing positive effects of home ownership on children's test scores and behavior failed in adequately controlling for factors other than home ownership and that when they are taken into account, home ownership has no economically or statistically-significant effects.

A paper analyzing the economics of the 1867 Alaska Purchase by the US from Russia argued that the financial returns to the federal government, tax revenue minus administrative costs, have been lower than alternative investments with similar risk.

Barker is the author of Welcome to Free America, a book set in 2057 as a guide to immigrants coming to the former United States after the collapse of government. It describes a difficult period of transition, but eventually, private companies take over functions previously performed by governments, such as security, dispute resolution, production of money and infrastructure, and national defense. The result is a society that is different, in many ways, from today. Barker stated that he does not advocate the elimination of government and that his book is only an attempt to explore where libertarian ideas might lead. According to him, the result could be considered by different people to be a utopia or a dystopia.

Political activities 
Barker was a delegate to the Republican National Convention in Cleveland in 2016.  He is also a member of the State Central Committee of the Republican Party of Iowa and was appointed to the Executive Council of the Empower Rural Iowa Initiative by Governor Kim Reynolds.

Business activities
Barker's companies own over 2,000 apartments in the Midwestern United States, along with office buildings, self-storage facilities, and convenience stores. Barker is also president of Barker Financial, which makes commercial loans.  Barker has also constructed new apartments. In 2017 and 2018 Barker completed historic renovation projects in Marion, Iowa, Fort Madison, Iowa, and Fond du Lac, Wisconsin, and a $20.4 million purchase of apartments in Little Rock, Arkansas.

References

1961 births
University of Chicago faculty
Writers from Iowa City, Iowa
University of California, Berkeley alumni
University of Chicago alumni
21st-century American businesspeople
Living people
Iowa City West High School alumni